Brett Bodine Racing was a NASCAR racing team from 1996 until 2003. It was owned by former NASCAR driver Brett Bodine and his then-wife Diane, and fielded the No. 11 car for Bodine, who purchased the team from Junior Johnson & Associates (for whom he had driven for in 1995) during the 1995–96 offseason. In purchasing the team Brett joined his brother Geoff as an owner-driver, Geoff having purchased the assets of AK Racing after Alan Kulwicki (also an owner-driver) was killed in a plane crash on April 1, 1993.

The team closed following the 2003 season after failing to find a full-time sponsor.

NASCAR Cup Series

Car No. 11 History
Brett Bodine drove the 11 car for Junior Johnson in 1995 with Lowe's sponsorship and drove the car again with Lowe's sponsorship in 1996 as an owner/driver.  Brett's team struggled with consistency that season but they did manage to finish 24th in the points standings, with one top ten. After the season, Lowe's left to sponsor the No. 31 at Richard Childress Racing and Bodine's sponsorship woes began.

1997 saw Brett sign a long term sponsorship deal that would put Close Call Phone Cards on the car.  The season started off well with Bodine achieving two top ten finishes in the first 9 races.  However, just half-way into the season Close-Call stopped paying its sponsorship bills and Brett was forced to strip the decals off of his car. The car ran unsponsored for the remainder of the season and Bodine was forced to sell part of the team to Andy Evans, although he later re-acquired full interest. Bodine later accused Evans of trying to steal his team.

1998 and 1999 found Bodine with reliable sponsorship from Paychex on his new Ford Taurus. He found modest success in 1998 finishing 25th overall in points, despite failing to finish in the top ten all season. He did, however, manage to finish in the top 20 on eleven occasions.

After 1998, Bodine struggled in 1999. He was only able to reach 35th-place in the final standing, again with no top tens and only four top 20s. The No. 11 team also failed to qualify for 2 events and Paychex chose not to return at the end of the season.

Without a sponsor having been found, Brett sold half-interest in his team once again, this time to Richard Hilton. As part of the deal Ralphs would come on as the primary sponsor. Although the sale of the team fell through Brett was able to retain the Ralphs sponsorship. However, the team reached only 35th place in the final points standings with no top tens and just 5 top twenties. They failed to qualify for five of the races.

Despite this, Ralphs came back to the team in 2001 as the primary sponsor and Brett signed RedCell Batteries as an associate, and the team received engines from Robert Yates Racing. But another blow to the organization RedCell stopped paying its dues midseason, and the team once again was forced to go without strong backing.  They were able to work through these troubles and had a very successful season. They qualified for every race, finished in the top ten twice, the top twenty nine times, and moved up five spots to 30th in the points standings.

Despite the team's success in 2001 a primary sponsor was not forthcoming for 2002.  Brett entered the season with just the associates Timberland Pro and Wells Fargo Financial. Dura Lube came on to help out early in the season until Brett picked up Hooters sponsorship for the 4th race of the season. At the start of the 2002 season the team were way behind in all aspects due to securing sponsorship so late in the season. Brett managed no top tens, only 4 top 20s, and 36th in the final standings while missing four races.

Hooters came back in 2003, but with far less money. The team scaled back to only a limited schedule. Geoffrey Bodine drove the car in the Bud Shootout at Daytona and Brett ran 5 early season races before Hooters pulled the plug, leaving the team with no sponsor. To compound problems, that same weekend in practice Brett was involved in a horrifying crash that sidelined him for several weeks.  His brother Geoffrey drove the No. 11 Brett Bodine Racing Ford, for his injured brother, in its final race finishing 39th. With no major sponsorship for his team and most of his employees laid off, Brett attempted to run at Indy in a fan-sponsored "Brick Car" where, for $500, fans would get their name on the car. The program was a success, but Brett failed to qualify for the race by 0.001 seconds. No sponsor was found and the team was sold.

Car No. 11 results

Car No. 09 History
2001 saw Brett Bodine Racing expand to a two car team for two races.  Driven by the No. 11's car success Brett was able to field a second car, driven by brother Geoffrey, at both Bristol and Homestead with sponsorship from Smirnoff Ice and Miccosukee Casino, respectively. Bodine finished 27th at Bristol and 37th at Homestead. The team was to continue to run a limited schedule in 2002 but was never able to find a primary sponsor. The No. 09 Brett Bodine Racing Fords never returned to the track, with the team number being reassigned to Phoenix Racing.

Car No. 09 results

Car No. 27 History
In 2002 Hooters had a small sponsorship deal with independent driver Kirk Shelmerdine. When Hooters signed on to sponsor the Brett Bodine Racing team, part of the deal involved Brett was to run Kirk in a couple of races in the No. 27 sponsored by Naturally Fresh Foods. However, this quickly came to end when Kirk was unable to make a race, and the drivers went their own ways.

Busch Series

Car No. 11 History
This car made its debut at Richmond in 2001 with Josh Richeson, a relative of Brett's, behind the wheel. The car's numbers were 6 and 06. In 2002 the car's number was changed to 11 and Brett was able to field Josh in seven races. The car was unsponsored in two events, sponsored by Smuckers in one event and by one of Brett's cup sponsors, Timberland Pro, in the other 4 events. 28th was the best ever finish by this car, achieved in its final start at Richmond in 2002.  The team did not have the financial means to run a Busch Series operation in 2003.

References

External links
 Racing Reference

1996 establishments in North Carolina
2003 disestablishments in North Carolina
American auto racing teams
Defunct companies based in North Carolina
Defunct NASCAR teams
Auto racing teams disestablished in 2003
Auto racing teams established in 1996
Bodine family